Makhu is a town and a nagar panchayat in Ferozepur district in Indian state of Punjab.

Geography
Makhu has an average elevation of 201 metres (659 feet). This town is located near the edge of Harike Sanctuary. It is 5 km away from the confluence of Satluj and Beas rivers.

Demographics
 India census, Makhu had a population of 12,173.  Males constitute 52% of the population and females 48%. Makhu has an average literacy rate of 88%, higher than the national average of 59.5%: male literacy is 87 percent, and female literacy is 89 percent In Makhu, 14% of the population is under 6 years of age.

Politics
The town is a part of Zira Assembly Constituency, and Naresh Kataria is the MLA elected in 2022.

Transport
Railway
The town has namesake Makhu Railway station which provides connectivity to major cities of Firozpur, Ludhiana and Jalandhar.
Road
Makhu is connected to rest of Punjab and nation through three national highways.
 National Highway 54 - Old NH 15
 National Highway 703A
 National Highway 703B

Major Healthcare Services 
 Wadhwa Hardware Store
 Wahi Medical Store
 Kalra Hospital
 City Hospital Makhu
 Civil Hospital Makhu
 Medicare hospital

References

Cities and towns in Firozpur district